Jencks could refer to:

Jencks v. United States, a U.S. Supreme Court case
Jencks Act, a law passed by the U.S. Congress regarding the rules of procedure in Federal courts, after the Supreme Court case had been decided

People with the surname Jencks
Bob Jencks (1941–2010), American football player
Charles Jencks (1939–2019) American cultural theorist, landscape designer, architectural historian, cancer center founder.
Christopher Jencks (born 1922), social scientist
Clinton Jencks (1918–2005), American labor and social justice activist
Maggie Keswick Jencks (1941–1995), Scottish writer, artist and garden designer
Penelope Jencks (born 1936), American sculptor
Richard Jencks (1921–2014), American television executive and lawyer
William Jencks (1927–2007), American biochemist.

See also
 Jenckes, a surname
 Jenks (disambiguation)